The 2008–09 season was Beşiktaş' 105th football season. Also it was the 50th year of the Süper Lig. Beşiktaş won the domestic double of the league title and cup.

Players

First-team squad

 **
 *

 *

 *

 * Also holds  German citizenship.
 ** Also holds  Australian citizenship.

Transfers

Transfers in

Transfers out

Loans out

Süper Lig

Results by round

First Half

Second half

Standings

Turkish Cup

After finishing in the top four of the previous season's Süper Lig, Beşiktaş qualified for the group stages. Beşiktaş was placed in Group A, along with Antalyaspor, Gaziantepspor, Trabzonspor and Gaziantep B.B. Beşiktaş finished first.

Group stage

Quarter-finals

Beşiktaş won 5-1 on aggregate

Semi-finals

Beşiktaş won 4-3 on aggregate

Final

UEFA Cup
After finishing third in the previous season's Süper Lig, Beşiktaş qualified for the 2008–09 UEFA Cup, but was eliminated in the first round.

Second qualifying round

Beşiktaş won 6-1 on aggregate

First round

Beşiktaş lost 2–4 on aggregate

References

Beşiktaş J.K. seasons
Besiktas
Turkish football championship-winning seasons